Forte de São João da Bertioga is a fort located on Santo Amaro Island (municipality of Guarujá), São Paulo in Brazil.

See also
Military history of Brazil

References

External links

Sao Joao
Buildings and structures in São Paulo (state)
Portuguese colonial architecture in Brazil